Lagoona Bloo is a New York City-based drag queen and recording artist.

Career 
Lagoona Bloo is New York City's mermaid pop star. In 2021, Lagoona made a splash in the music scene when she wrote and released her first two singles, "Greedy With My Love" (which has accrued over 400,000 streams on Spotify) and “Hands”, along with her debut EP, AQUA, and her original holiday bop, "Bloo Christmas." In 2022 she released new singles "C U Tonight", "Sticky Sweet" (with RuPaul's Drag Race alum, Lemon), and most recently, "Say It To The Sky".

Lagoona is the recipient of two 2022 Glam Awards for Best Vocalist and Best Cabaret Show (for Bloos in the Night). As a member of the critically acclaimed drag pop vocal trio, Stephanie's Child (with drag sisters Jan and Rosé), Lagoona has appeared on NBC's The Voice (alongside Jessie J) and America's Got Talent. Stephanie's Child released their first EP, Christmas Dolls: Volume I at the end of 2020, and were most recently featured on Alaska's latest single, "Girlz Night". 

Lagoona was also featured on an episode of Netflix's Emmy award-winning series Nailed It! where she and her teammate Selma Nilla brought home the top prize.

Lagoona has been featured in national commercials for Uber and Beats by Dr. Dre, as well as multiple social media campaigns for Bubly Sparkling Water (with Kim Petras). Some of Lagoona's most notable live performances include World Pride, London Pride, singing with the American Pops Orchestra, opening for Vincint at Irving Plaza, and originating the role of Tuna Turner in "Drag: The Musical" at The Bourbon Room in Los Angeles. She most recently finished performing all over North America with Alaska on her Red 4 Filth tour!

References

External links 

 

Living people
American drag queens
People from New York City
Year of birth missing (living people)